Masoud Abdallah Salim (born 24 October 1962) is a Tanzanian ACT Wazalendo politician and Member of Parliament for Mtambile constituency since 2003 to 2020.

References

Living people
1962 births
Civic United Front MPs
Tanzanian MPs 2000–2005
Tanzanian MPs 2005–2010
Tanzanian MPs 2010–2015
Mtambile Secondary School alumni
Shangani Secondary School alumni
Fidel Castro Secondary School alumni
Zanzibari politicians
Alliance for Change and Transparency politicians